Pasha is a Persian honorary title that has since also become a surname of Muslim elites in Pakistan and Iran. Notable individuals with the surname include:

 Abdul Aziz Pasha (died 2001), Bangladeshi army officer convicted for this role in the assassination of president Sheikh Mujibur Rahman 
 Ahmad Shuja Pasha (born 1952), retired three-star general in the Pakistan Army
 Anwar Kamal Pasha (1925–1987), pioneer in the Pakistan film industry and an early Pakistani film director and producer 
 Hafeez Pasha (economist), Pakistani economist, politician and government minister
 Hasan Raza Pasha, Pakistani Punjabi lawyer
 Juliana Pasha (born 1980), Albanian singer
 Kamran Pasha, American Hollywood screenwriter, director and novelist of Pakistani origin
 Mansha Pasha (born 1987), Pakistani actress and television presenter
 Muhammad Ghous Pasha, Pakistani actor and model
 Zeynab Pasha, Iranian woman during the Qajar dynasty in late 19th century, most notable for her role in the Tobacco Protest, the beginning of the Iran Constitutional Revolution, for leading a group of women in an uprising in the city of Tabriz

See also
 Pasha (disambiguation)
 Pasha, a high rank in the Ottoman political and military system

Social groups of Pakistan
Surnames of Pakistani origin
Surnames